George Bickford Moysey (14 May 1874 – 18 May 1932) was an Australian sportsman who played Australian rules football and cricket at a high level. He played for Melbourne in the Victorian Football League (VFL) and also competed in the West Australian Football Association/League. As a cricketer he played one first-class match for Western Australia.

Moysey was from Tasmania but was already playing for Melbourne by the time the VFL was formed. He was one of six Melbourne players to appear in all 17 possible games of the inaugural league season in 1897, which included three finals. His 12 goals that year were bettered by only two teammates. He spent two more seasons at the club and in 1899 represented Victoria in an interstate fixture against South Australia.

Having found employment at the Mount Morgans Gold Mine, Moysey moved to Western Australia at the turn of the 20th century. He worked there for six years, then moved to Perth, where he began playing for the Perth Football Club, which he would captain. Later, he also played for Subiaco.

When the Marylebone Cricket Club toured Australia in 1907/08, Moysey was picked in the Western Australian team to play them at the WACA Ground. Facing an attack that consisted of English Test players, the left handed batsman was bowled by Jack Crawford for eight in the first innings and dismissed by Wilfred Rhodes in his second innings.

In 1910 he almost drowned in The Basin at Rottnest Island when the current swept him out to sea. He was said to have been sinking by the time his companion, Percy Bailey, rescued him. Bailey received a Royal Humane Society award for his act of saving Moysey's life.

He would eventually return to the city of Melbourne and died there in 1932.

See also
 List of Western Australia first-class cricketers

References

1874 births
1932 deaths
Australian rules footballers from Tasmania
Australian Rules footballers: place kick exponents
Melbourne Football Club (VFA) players
Melbourne Football Club players
Perth Football Club players
Subiaco Football Club players
Australian cricketers
Western Australia cricketers
Australian gold prospectors
Cricketers from Tasmania